Round Grove Township is an inactive township in Marion County, in the U.S. state of Missouri.

Round Grove Township was established in 1833, and named for the shape of a grove within its borders.

References

Townships in Missouri
Townships in Marion County, Missouri